Krążkowo  is a village in the administrative district of Gmina Sadlinki, within Kwidzyn County, Pomeranian Voivodeship, in northern Poland. 

References

Villages in Kwidzyn County